Saint Marcellinus may refer to:

 Pope Marcellinus (died 304), bishop of Rome 296–304 and martyr
 Marcellinus and Peter (died 304), d. 304
 Marcellinus of Carthage (died 413), secretary of state to Honorius and martyr
 Marcellinus of Gaul, feast day April 20
 See Narcissus, Argeus, and Marcellinus for Marcellinus (died 320), soldier and martyr, d. 340
 St. Marcellinus Secondary School, Mississauga, Ontario

See also 
 Marcellinus (disambiguation)